Crucible was a free-to-play multiplayer third-person shooter developed and published by Relentless Studios, a subsidiary of Amazon Game Studios. It is Amazon's first major original title published by their gaming division, which had previously focused on tablet games. It became available for download on May 20, 2020, for Windows, after having been in development since 2014. The game returned to a closed beta status on June 30, 2020. On October 9, 2020, Relentless Studios announced that development would be discontinued within one month.

Gameplay 
Crucible was a hero shooter, similar to Overwatch or Team Fortress 2. Different playable characters, referred to as "hunters", impact which abilities players have. Matches were played in teams, meaning that players had to coordinate in order to ensure that their hunters' weaknesses are shored up by the others' strengths. The first team to complete the game mode's objective would win.

Release 
Because of COVID-19 the game experienced a remote launch without any in-person events. At launch, the game was in "pre-season" to allow developers to finetune the gaming experience.

Reception 

Crucible received mixed reviews from critics, according to review aggregator Metacritic.

Cancellation 
On October 9, 2020, Relentless Studios announced the cancellation of Crucible, citing the inability to see a sustained future as the reason for cancellation. The studio offered full refunds for any purchases made and was subsequently shifted to aid development of Amazon's other upcoming title, New World. Matchmaking would be discontinued in late October, and custom game servers would be shut down on November 9 at noon PST.

References

External links 
 

2020 video games
Esports games
Third-person shooters
Free-to-play video games
Hero shooters
Video games developed in the United States
Video games scored by Maclaine Diemer
Windows games
Windows-only games
Tactical shooter video games